Drosicha is a genus of true bugs belonging to the family Margarodidae.

The species of this genus are found in Eurasia.

Species:

Drosicha afganica 
Drosicha burmeisteri 
Drosicha contrahens 
Drosicha corpulenta 
Drosicha dalbergiae 
Drosicha frauenfeldi 
Drosicha howardi 
Drosicha jujubae 
Drosicha koreiensis 
Drosicha leachii 
Drosicha littorea 
Drosicha malaysiensis 
Drosicha mangiferae 
Drosicha maskelli 
Drosicha minor 
Drosicha palavanica 
Drosicha philippinensis 
Drosicha pinicola 
Drosicha quadricaudata 
Drosicha saundersii 
Drosicha stebbingii 
Drosicha sumatrensis 
Drosicha townsendi 
Drosicha turkestanica 
Drosicha variegata

References

Margarodidae